Freddy Alberto León Aristizábal (born 24 September 1970) is a retired Colombian football striker.

He was born in Bogotá. He spent the main part of his career in Millonarios from 1990 through 2000, except a spell in Deportes Tolima from 1996 through 1998. Between 2002 and 2007 he played short spells for lesser clubs; Centauros Villavicencio, Patriotas FC, Cortuluá and Expreso Rojo.

He was capped 8 times for Colombia national football team in 1995, including at the 1995 Copa América.

References

1970 births
Living people
Association football forwards
Colombian footballers
Colombia international footballers
1995 Copa América players
Millonarios F.C. players
Deportes Tolima footballers
Centauros Villavicencio footballers
Patriotas Boyacá footballers
Cortuluá footballers
Tigres F.C. footballers
Footballers from Bogotá